The Futurist may refer to:

 The Futurist, a publication by the World Future Society
 "The Futurist Manifesto", a 1909 essay by Italian poet Filippo Tommaso Marinetti
 The Futurist (Shellac album), 1997
 The Futurist (Robert Downey Jr. album), 2004
 The Futurist Cinema, Liverpool, a cinema in England
 Futurist Theatre in Scarborough, North Yorkshire

See also
 Futurism (disambiguation)